John Langworthy Fuller (July 22, 1910 – June 8, 1992) was an American biologist and early pioneer of behavior genetics. Fuller was a researcher at the Jackson Laboratory from 1947 to 1970 and professor (and later chair) of psychology at the Binghamton University from 1970 until retiring in 1977.

Selected works

Books
 
 Fuller 1960, "Behavior Genetics", Annual Review of Psychology, 11(1), 41–70. doi:10.1146/annurev.ps.11.020160.000353

References

1910 births
1992 deaths
People from Brandon, Vermont
Massachusetts Institute of Technology alumni
Behavior geneticists
Ethologists
Binghamton University faculty
20th-century American zoologists